David Myles may refer to:
 David Myles (politician) (1925–2018), Scottish Conservative Party politician, MP (1979–1983)
 David Myles (rugby league) (born 1978), Australian rugby league player
 David Myles (musician) (born 1981), musician from Fredericton, New Brunswick, Canada

See also
 David Miles (disambiguation)